"Gringo" is a song by Italian singer Sabrina. It was produced by Giampiero Menzione. The song was released as a non-album single in July 1989. It was a minor hit in UK, where it peaked at number 95.

Song information
'Gringo' was written by Sabrina and Elvio Moratto. Outside Italy, "Gringo" was licensed to the international record label BMG  which resulted in the song being released in many countries and formats.

Formats and track listings
 CD Single
 "Gringo" (Extended Mix) – 5:04
 "Gringo" (Club Mix) – 5:27
 "Gringo" (New Age Mix) – 3:45
 "Gringo" (In the House) – 2:51
 "Gringo" – 3:55
 7" Single
 "Gringo" – 3:55
 "Gringo" (New Age Mix) – 3:45
 12" Single
 "Gringo" (Extended Mix) – 5:04
 "Gringo" (Club Mix) – 5:27
 "Gringo" (In the House) – 2:51
 "Gringo" – 3:55

Charts

References

1989 songs
Sabrina Salerno songs
Songs written by Sabrina Salerno